

Marietta is a historic house and former tobacco plantation located in Glenn Dale, Prince George's County, Maryland. On the National Register of Historic Places and the National Underground Railroad Network to Freedom, Marietta House Museum includes a federal era house, a cemetery, the original root cellar, and harness room, as well as Judge Gabriel Duvall’s original law office building. The historic site sits on 25 acres of Marietta’s original 690 acres. Today, visitors can walk the grounds and tour the plantation buildings and sites where free and enslaved people lived and labored.

History
Marietta is a 2.5-story brick Federal house, built in 1812–13, in a traditional I-house plan. It is an important example of a late Federal style brick house. The main block is five bays by two, and the main entrance is through the central bay of the south facade. Attached perpendicular to the north side of the main block at right angles is a two-story rear wing, built c. 1832, and attached to the west gable end is an L-shaped wing added in 1968. Marietta stands on terraced, landscaped grounds with two contemporary outbuildings: a brick law office and a stone and brick root cellar/harness storage room.

Enslaved people built Marietta at the direction of Gabriel Duvall (1752-1844), who was a lawyer, Maryland legislator, U.S. Congressman, U.S. Comptroller, and U.S. Supreme Court Justice from 1811 to 1835.

The Duvall family enslaved many people at Marietta until the state ended slavery in Maryland in 1864. In any given year between 1812 and 1865, anywhere between nine and forty enslaved people lived and worked at Marietta. Among the enslaved at Marietta were multiple generations of the Duckett, Butler, Jackson, and Brown families. After Justice Duvall died in 1844, Marietta remained the residence of his heirs until 1902.

Marietta House Museum
The site is operated as the Marietta House Museum of the Maryland-National Capital Park and Planning Commission, Parks and Recreation of Prince George’s County Division of Natural and Historic Resources. The house is operated as a historic house museum and is furnished to reflect the three generations of Duvall family members and those they enslaved and employed. The museum is dedicated to giving voice to those enslaved families and individuals who lived and labored at Marietta in the 18th and 19th centuries. Since 2004, Marietta has been part of the National Underground Railroad Network to Freedom.

The museum’s mission reads, “Marietta House Museum is dedicated to exploring, elevating, and transforming awareness of the interconnected relationships of the people and their descendants who lived and labored at Marietta. As a public history steward, Marietta is committed to co-curating discussions, exhibitions, and programs with broad community input to promote universal social equity. Marietta interprets the historical architecture and landscape across Prince George’s County, Maryland, through inclusive United States American history.”

Guided tours of Marietta House Museum highlight the relationships among the enslaved people and their enslavers that were shaped in part by the nation’s founding documents and local slave codes. Visitors learn the histories of the enslaved families including the Ducketts, Jacksons, Browns, and Butlers and their decisions to seek freedom through flight, the courts, and deeds.

Gallery

References

External links

, including photo in 1993, at Maryland Historical Trust website
Marietta House Museum - Prince George's County Dept. of Park & Recreation
Prince George's County Historical Society

Glenn Dale, Maryland
Houses on the National Register of Historic Places in Maryland
Houses in Prince George's County, Maryland
Houses completed in 1812
Historic house museums in Maryland
Duvall family
National Register of Historic Places in Prince George's County, Maryland